The Future in America: A Search After Realities is a 1906 travel essay by H. G. Wells recounting his impressions from the first of half a dozen visits he would make to the United States.  The book consists of fifteen chapters and a concluding "envoy".

Wells describes the United States as "a great and energetic English-speaking population strewn across a continent so vast as to make it seem small and thin ... caught by the upward sweep of that great increase of knowledge that is everywhere enlarging the power and scope of human effort, exhilarated by it, and active and hopeful beyond any population the world has ever seen" engaged in "a universal commercial competition that must, in the end, if it is not modified, divide them into two permanent classes of rich and poor."

Much of the book is devoted to a discussion of American social problems: labor, corruption (through Jane Addams Wells was able to visit Chicago slums and a corrupt alderman's saloon), immigration (Wells called for either "a gigantic and costly machinery organized to educate and civilize" immigrants, or restriction "to numbers assimilable under existing conditions"), "state-blindness" (by which Wells means the typical American's failure to perceive "that his business activities, his private employments, are constituents in a large collective process"), injustice, racial prejudice (he met with Booker T. Washington, rejected the viability of segregation, and praised the "heroic" resolve of black Americans), American universities, Boston's excessive attachment to the past, and the urgent need for democratizing political reform. The last chapter of the book is devoted to impressions of Theodore Roosevelt, whom he visited at the White House and whom Wells sees as representative not only of the United States but also as "a very symbol of the creative will in man," "the creative purpose, the good-will in men." The Future in America concludes with an "envoy" announcing that "in America, by sheer virtue of its size, its free traditions, and the habit of initiative in its people, the leadership of progress must ultimately rest."

Background
Wells's voyage to America took place in the midst of his unsuccessful effort to reform the Fabian Society. He boarded the Carmania on 27 March 1906 and returned to Great Britain on the Cambria on 27 May.  Parts of the book were serialized in the Tribune in Britain and in Harper's Weekly in the US from July to October.  The volume was published in October 1906.

Reception
The Future in America was well received in the United States, where Wells "always enjoyed a good reputation, and had occasional strong friendships with those on the American left such as Lincoln Steffens, Ella Winter, Upton Sinclair, and others"; in Britain the book was very successful and was praised by Morley Roberts, Winston Churchill, and Beatrice Webb.

Notes

References

Footnotes

Bibliography

Further reading

 

1906 non-fiction books
Books about the United States
Books by H. G. Wells
Chapman & Hall books